Hastinapur is a city in the Meerut district in the Indian state of Uttar Pradesh. Hastinapura, described in Hindu texts such as the Mahabharata and the Puranas as the capital of the Kuru Kingdom, is also mentioned in ancient Jain texts. Hastinapur is located on the right bank of the Ganga river.

Etymology
In Sanskrit, Hastinapura translates to 'the City of Elephants' from Hastina (elephant) and pura (city). Its history dates back to the period of Mahabharata. It is said that the city was named after King Hasti.

It is also mentioned in the Ramayana , the 13th and 14th verses of which say (translated):

History
The early archaeological remains of the region belong to Ochre Coloured Pottery culture which was a Bronze Age culture of Ganga Yamuna doab. Around c.1200 BCE the region transformed to an Iron Age culture. The region was occupied by the Painted Grey Ware culture which corresponds to the Vedic Period.

In the Mahabharata, Hastinapur is portrayed as the capital of the Kuru Kingdom of the Kauravas. Many incidents in the Mahabharata were set in the city of Hastinapur. According to the Mahabharata, the 100 Kaurava brothers were born in this city to their mother, Queen Gandhari, the wife of King Dhritarashtra. On the bank of the Budhi Ganga, two places near Hastinapur (Draupadi Ghat and Karna Ghat) reference Mahabharata personages.

The first reference to Hastinapur in the Puranas presents the city as the capital of Emperor Bharata's kingdom.

Excavations at Hastinapur were carried out in the early 1950s by B.B. Lal, Director General of the Archaeological Survey of India. Although the main aim of this excavation, according to Lal himself, was to determine the stratigraphic position of Painted Grey Ware concerning other known ceramic industries of the early historical period, Lal found correlations between the text of the Mahabharata and the material remains that he unearthed at Hastinapur. This led him to historicize some of the traditions mentioned in the Mahabharata as well as link the appearance of the Painted Grey Ware with Aryans in the upper Ganges basin areas.

Hastinapur is listed in the Ain-i-Akbari as a pargana under Delhi sarkar, producing a revenue of 4,466,904 dams for the imperial treasury and supplying a force of 300 infantry and 10 cavalry. The author Abu'l-Fazl ibn Mubarak describes it "an ancient Hindu settlement" lying on the Ganges.

During British India, Hastinapur was ruled by Raja Nain Singh Nagar, who built many Hindu temples in and around Hastinapura.

Geography and climate
The monsoon season is from July to September, during which the temperature is relatively low. Winter lasts from December to February, with December usually being the coldest month of the year.

Demographics
According to the 2001 Census of India, Hastinapur had a population of 58,452, with males constituting 53% and females accounting for 47%. The literacy rate of the town was 73.9% against the national average of 59.5%. Around 15% of the population was under 10 years of age. According to the 2011 Census of India, Hastinapur's population had fallen to 21,249.

Places of interest
Located on the banks of an old ravine of the Ganges, Hastinapur is considered one of the holiest places for both Hindus and Jains alike. It is believed to be the birthplace of three Jain Tirthankaras. There are many ancient Hindu temples including Pandeshwar Temple and Karna Temple, as well as Jain temples such as Shri Digamber, Jain Mandir, Jambudweep, Kailash Parvat, and Shwetambar Jain Temple.

Temples and monuments

Shri Digamber Jain Prachin Bada Mandir

Shri Digamber Jain Bada Mandir is one of the oldest Jain temples in Hastinapur. The main temple is believed to have been built in 1801 under the aegis of Raja Harsukh Rai, who was the imperial treasurer of Emperor Shah Alam II. The temple has many other facilities, including, police station, Digamber Jain Gurukul, and a Udaseen Ashram. Several tourist attractions including Jal Mandir, Jain Library, Acharya Vidyanand Museum, 24 Tonks, and the ancient Nishiyajis are situated few kilometres from the main temple.

Shri Shwetambar Jain Ashtapad Teerth

Shri Ashtapad Teerth was built under the aegis of Shri Hastinapur Jain Shwetambar Teerth Trust. It is a  structure dedicated to first tirthankara Rishabhnath.

Kailash Parvat Rachna
Kailash Parvat is a  structure, constructed under the aegis of Shri Digamber Jain Mandir, Hastinapur. The Kailash Parvat premises are home to several Jain temples, including Yatri Niwas and Bhojanshala. Kailash Parvat also has an auditorium and a helipad on the premises.

Jambudweep Jain Tirth

Jambudweep, depicting a model of Jain cosmology, was designed here under the supervision of Shri Gyanmati Mataji in 1985.

Pandeshwar Temple
Situated in the historic location of the ancient city of Hastinapur, the Pandeshwar temple is dedicated to Shiva. This temple is believed to be the place where Kauravas and Pandavas received their education in Vedas and Puranas. A temple of the Hindu goddess Kali and many Hindu ashramas are also present on a hillock between the ruins. Legend has it that in the Mahabharata period, Pandu's eldest son Yudhishthira had established the shivalinga at the Pandeshwar Mahadev temple before the war of Mahabharata and prayed to Shiva for a blessing of winning the war.

Karna Temple

The Karna Temple is located near the Pandeshwar temple on an old ravine along the bank of the Ganges. The Shivling inside the Karna Temple is believed to be established by Karna, one of the prominent figures in the Mahabharata.

Bhai Dharam Singh Gurdwara

Hastinapur Sanctuary

Hastinapur Sanctuary, established in 1986, is one of the prominent wildlife projects in India. The sanctuary extends over a wide area, encompassing the districts of Meerut, Ghaziabad, Gautam Budh Nagar, Bijnor, Hapur, and Jyotiba Phule Nagar in Uttar Pradesh.

Festivals and fairs
Various cultural events and religious celebrations are held in Hastinapur annually, including Akshaya Tritiya, Das Lakshana, Kartik Mela, Holi Mela, and Durga Puja. These festivals, among others, are organized by non-government organizations (NGOs) and the State Tourism Department.

See also
 Indraprastha
 Mahabharata
 Digamber Jain Bada Mandir Hastinapur
 Jambudweep
Historicity of the Mahabharata

References

Further reading

External links
 

Locations in Hindu mythology
Ancient Indian cities
Jainism in Uttar Pradesh
Places in the Mahabharata
Meerut district
Cities and towns in Meerut district
Jain pilgrimage sites
Tourist attractions in Meerut district
Bronze Age sites in Asia